Molybdenum carbide is an extremely hard refractory ceramic material, commercially used in tool bits for cutting tools.

There are at least three reported phases of molybdenum carbide: γ-MoC, β-Mo2C, and  γ'. The γ phase is structurally identical to tungsten carbide.

β-Mo2C has been suggested as a catalyst for carbon dioxide hydrogenation. The γ' phase forms by combining the elements at relatively low temperatures, and transforms to the γ phase at 800 °C.

References

Carbides
Molybdenum compounds
Superhard materials
Refractory materials